Olympique de Moka is a Mauritian football club based in Moka. They play in the Championnat de Maurice D3.

In 2001 the team had won the Mauritian League.

Stadium
Their home stadium is Maryse Justin Stadium (cap. 3,000), located in Moka.

Honours
Mauritian League:2001

References

External links
:fr:Olympique de Moka

Football clubs in Mauritius